Area codes 818 and 747 are area codes that primarily cover the San Fernando Valley region of Los Angeles County in the U.S. state of California. 

Area code 818 was created in a split from area code 213 on January 7, 1984. On June 14, 1997, area code 818 was split to form area code 626 for most of the San Gabriel Valley. On May 18, 2009, area code 747 went into service as an overlay.

History
After the standardization of American telephone area codes in 1947, almost all of Los Angeles County used the 213 area code. Because the population and phone usage of the Los Angeles metropolitan area greatly increased during the 1980s and 1990s, the 213 area code was split into several new area codes, including the 818 and 310 area codes. The 818 area code entered service on January 7, 1984, making Los Angeles one of the first major cities to be split between multiple area codes. Area code 626 was carved out of the eastern portion on June 14, 1997.

In November 1999, it was proposed that "at some future date", a new 747 area code would split from 818, the new 747 serving the southern and western portions of the San Fernando Valley. This proposal sat dormant until 2007, when the telephone industry and the California Public Utilities Commission began studying implementing this 818/747 split, or possibly an overlay of all of 818 with 747. Public hearings were held, and the overall public sentiment was for an overlay rather than the split, since they could retain the 818 area code for their existing telephone numbers. The new 747 area code would be used for numbers associated with new service.

On April 24, 2008, the CPUC decided that area code 747 would overlay area code 818 effective May 18, 2009. From that date, new numbers could be assigned to the new area code. Callers within the 818 and 747 area codes would be required to dial the area code (including calls to the same area code; cell phones could dial with or without the "1" prefix) for all calls. There was a grace period starting October 11, 2008 during which callers could still complete calls using the seven-digit number. Since mid-April 2009, calls must be dialed with the area code and number; otherwise, the call will not be completed (cell phone users can omit the "1").

The first telephone number block to be assigned to area code 747 became effective on October 11, 2009.

Cities in the 747/818 area code

Neighborhoods/districts in Los Angeles City

 Arleta
 Canoga Park
 Chatsworth
 Encino
 Granada Hills
 Lake View Terrace
 Lake Balboa
 Mission Hills
 North Hills
 North Hollywood
 Northridge
 Pacoima
 Panorama City
 Porter Ranch
 Reseda
 Shadow Hills
 Sherman Oaks
 Studio City
 Sunland
 Sun Valley
 Sylmar
 Tarzana
 Toluca Lake
 Tujunga
 Valley Village
 Van Nuys
 West Hills
 Winnetka
 Woodland Hills

Los Angeles County

 Agoura Hills
 Burbank
 Calabasas
 Glendale 
 Hidden Hills
 La Cañada Flintridge
 La Crescenta-Montrose
 Malibu Lake
 Monte Nido 
 San Fernando
 Topanga (mostly in the 310 area code)
 Universal City
 Westlake Village

Ventura County
 Bell Canyon
 North Ranch (part of Thousand Oaks/Westlake Village)
 Oak Park

747 area code conflict with 747 SIP addresses
The 747 area code conflicted with 10-digit Session Initiation Protocol addresses on some VoIP networks such as Gizmo5 (in the format 747NXXXXXX). Because of this conflict, some outgoing calls from VoIP networks using a 10-digit SIP address could have been mistaken for calls originating from the actual 747 area code.

These addresses are no longer in use as Gizmo5 service was discontinued as of April 3, 2011.

See also
 List of California area codes
 List of NANP area codes
 North American Numbering Plan

References

External links

747 And 818
Los Angeles County, California
San Fernando Valley
Telecommunications-related introductions in 1984
Telecommunications-related introductions in 2009
747 And 818